Fluminicola nuttallianus, common name dusky pebblesnail, is a possibly extinct species of freshwater snail with an operculum, an aquatic gastropod mollusk in the family Lithoglyphidae.

Fluminicola nuttallianus is the type species of the genus Fluminicola.

Distribution
This species occurs (or occurred) in Oregon, USA.

Description
Fluminicola nuttallianus has several (not exactly counted) rows of teeth on its radula. Each row has 2-3 central basocones, 4-5 central octocones, 7-8 lateral teeth, ca. 16 inner marginal teeth and 12-13 outer marginal teeth.

References

Lithoglyphidae
Extinct gastropods
Gastropods described in 1838